The Slave Trade Act 1873 (36 & 37 Vict c 88) is an Act of the Parliament of the United Kingdom "for consolidating with Amendments the Acts for carrying into effect Treaties for the more effectual Suppression of the Slave Trade, and for other purposes connected with the Slave Trade."

See also 
 Slave Trade Acts
 Slave Trade Act 1807
 Slave Trade Act 1824 
 Slavery Abolition Act 1833
 Slave Trade Act 1843

Notes

External links 
 Text of the Slave Trade Act 1873

1873 in British law
1873 in the United Kingdom
Abolitionism in the United Kingdom
United Kingdom Acts of Parliament 1873
Slave trade legislation